The Flamingo-on-the-Lake Apartments, also known as the Flamingo Apartment Hotel, is a building designed by architect William C. Reichert and located at 5500-5520 S. Shore Drive along Lake Michigan in the Hyde Park neighborhood of Chicago, Illinois. The 16-story apartment building was built with 144 apartments and 16 hotel rooms in 1927; it also featured an outdoor pool and bathhouse. It was designed in the Classical Revival style; its exterior is red brick with terra cotta ornamentation and a dentillated cornice. It and the adjacent building, The Promontory Apartments, a co-op building designed by Mies van der Rohe, are the furthest east buildings in Hyde Park.

The building was added to the National Register of Historic Places on May 14, 1986.

References

External links

Building Website

Residential buildings on the National Register of Historic Places in Chicago
Apartment buildings in Chicago
Residential buildings completed in 1927
1927 establishments in Illinois